Route 61, a.k.a. Foxtrap Access Road, is a short access road which connects the Trans-Canada Highway with Foxtrap, part of the town of Conception Bay South.

Route description

Route 61 begins at an interchange with Route 1 (Trans-Canada Highway, Exit 39) south of town. It heads northwest through rural wooded areas to enter the town limits, and begins passing through neighbourhoods to have an interchange with Route 2 (Peacekeepers Way). The highway now passes by several parks and businesses before coming to an end near the coastline at an intersection with Route 60 (Conception Bay Highway).

Major intersections

See also

List of highways numbered 61

References

061